Northrop High School is a Fort Wayne Community Schools high school located in the northern suburbs of Fort Wayne, Allen County, Indiana. Northrop is classified as 5A by the IHSAA. Northrop High School has had a sister school, the Goethe Gymnasium, in Fort Wayne's sister city, Gera, Germany, since 1994.

Demographics
The demographic breakdown of the 2181 students enrolled in 2012-2013 was:

Male - 52.1%
Female - 47.9%
Native American/Alaskan - 0.5%
Asian/Pacific islander - 3.6%
Black - 11%
Hispanic - 9.1%
White - 64.4%
Multiracial - 5.4%

Arts
Northrop's Mixed show choir, Charisma competes in competitions and festivals throughout the Midwest.  Allure is Northrop's all female show choir. Allure competes similar to Charisma all around the Midwest.  The Big Orange Pride or BOP is Northrop High School's Marching Band. They compete as an ISSMA Class A Open school, but switched to Class A Scholastic under the direction of Rob F. Wilson in 2016. They were 1983 ISSMA Class A State Champion.

Athletics
The Bruins are members of the Summit Athletic Conference.  The school's team name is the Bruins and their colors are burnt orange, brown and teal.  Many sports are offered at Northrop.  Here is a listing, along with the state team championships won.

Baseball (boys)
State champ - 1983
Basketball (boys & girls)
Boys state champ - 1974
Girls state champ - 1986
Cross country (boys & girls)
Football (boys)
Golf (boys & girls)
Boys state champ - 1984
Gymnastics (girls)
Soccer (boys & girls)
Softball (girls)
Swimming (boys & girls)
Tennis (boys & girls)
Track (boys & girls)
Boys state champ - 1997, 2004
Girls state champ - 1981, 1991, 2000–2005, 2011, and 2013
Wrestling (boys)

Notable alumni
 Dan Butler, American television, film, and stage actor.
 Heather Headley, Broadway and R&B singer.
 Jon Schaffer, guitarist in the power/thrash metal band Iced Earth.
 Eric Wedge, NCAA Baseball manager for Wichita State University, formerly and MLB manager for the Cleveland Indians and the Seattle Mariners.
 Josh Gaines, Arena Football League player.
 Matt Land, Trine University football coach.
 Walter Jordan, NBA basketball small forward.

See also
 List of high schools in Indiana

References

External links
 Northrop High School website
 Fort Wayne Community Schools website
 Indiana Department of Education statistics

Public high schools in Indiana
Schools in Fort Wayne, Indiana
1971 establishments in Indiana
Educational institutions established in 1971